Salina is a genus of elongate-bodied springtails in the family Paronellidae. There are about five described species in Salina.

Species
 Salina banksi Macgillivray, 1894
 Salina beta Christiansen & Bellinger, 1980
 Salina celebensis (Schaeffer, 1898)
 Salina mulcahyae Christiansen & Bellinger, 1980
 Salina trilobata Mills, 1932

References

Collembola
Springtail genera